The A972 is a major road in Dundee, Scotland. It forms part of the dual carriageway known as the 'Kingsway', that runs through the northern part of Dundee. Its main function is to link the A90 road with the A92.

At its western end, the A972 joins with the A90 at its Forfar road junction. Running eastward , the road meets with Pitkerro Road, then after a further , with the Mid Craigie Road roundabout. After a further , the road ends at the Scott Fyffe Circle (roundabout), where it meets the A92.

History
The A972 number used to include a longer stretch of road bypassing Dundee. In 1994 as part of a wider re-numbering, this section became part of the A90.

References

Roads in Scotland
Transport in Dundee